Uhlan was a New Zealand thoroughbred horse that won the Boxing Day 1898 Auckland Cup.

W H Bartlett filmed Uhlan winning the Auckland Cup at Ellerslie Racecourse for the entrepreneur Alfred Henry Whitehouse. This was the first time a horse-race had been filmed in New Zealand.

Principal race wins
 1898 Auckland Cup
 1898 ARC Handicap

See also
 Thoroughbred racing in New Zealand

References

External links
 Uhlan's pedigree Pedigree online Thoroughbred Database

1890s in New Zealand cinema
1893 racehorse births
Auckland Cup winners
Racehorses bred in New Zealand
Racehorses trained in New Zealand